Synnøve Konglevoll (born 16 June 1972 in Tromsø) is a Norwegian politician for the Labour Party.

She was elected to the Norwegian Parliament from Troms in 1997, and was re-elected on one occasion.

She is also deputy chairman of the board of the Norwegian Society for the Conservation of Nature.

References

1960 births
Living people
Labour Party (Norway) politicians
Members of the Storting
Politicians from Tromsø
University of Tromsø alumni
University of Oslo alumni
BI Norwegian Business School alumni
Women members of the Storting
21st-century Norwegian politicians
21st-century Norwegian women politicians
20th-century Norwegian politicians
20th-century Norwegian women politicians